This page documents notable tornadoes and tornado outbreaks worldwide in 2016.  Strong and destructive tornadoes form most frequently in the United States, Bangladesh, Brazil and Eastern India, but they can occur almost anywhere under the right conditions.  Tornadoes also develop occasionally in southern Canada during the Northern Hemisphere's summer and somewhat regularly at other times of the year across Europe, Asia, and Australia.  Tornadic events are often accompanied with other forms of severe weather, including strong thunderstorms, strong winds, and hail.

There were 1,059 tornadoes reported in the United States in 2016, of which 976 were confirmed. Worldwide, 130 fatalities were reported: 100 in China, 18 in the United States, five in Uruguay, four in Brazil and two in Italy, Russia and Indonesia each. 2016 was slightly below-average in terms of tornadic activity, but near-record tornado numbers occurred in February.

Synopsis

Tornado activity was expected to be low during the first quarter of 2016 due to a major El Niño event that would last into early spring. However, this did not come to fruition, as 2016 had the third most active first two months of the past 10 years, only behind 2008 and 2007. A significant outbreak impacted the southeastern and South Atlantic states on February 23 and 24; 61 confirmed tornadoes occurred, including four which were rated EF3. Seven fatalities occurred as a result of the outbreak. The generally above-average trend continued, to a much lesser degree, throughout the month of March, which saw 84 confirmed tornadoes. April, by contrast, was below average in terms of tornadic activity, with 142 confirmed tornadoes across the United States in the space of the month. On April 15, a large F3 multiple-vortex tornado struck the city of Dolores in Uruguay, demolishing over 400 buildings and causing five fatalities.

Beginning in May, however, tornado activity increased, with a significant tornado outbreak affecting the central United States from May 7 through May 10, producing the first EF4 tornado of the year. In the middle of the month, it was relatively quiet; however, from May 22 through May 26, another significant outbreak occurred, which produced multiple strong to violent tornadoes. A tornado family impacted southwestern Kansas near Dodge City in the evening of May 24; five of the tornadoes were rated EF3, though no fatalities occurred. The most significant tornado of the event was a high-end EF4 wedge tornado which tracked through Ottawa and Dickinson Counties in central Kansas. A split-level home to the north of Abilene was swept away; numerous vehicles including a Freightliner truck and a combine harvester were tossed and mangled beyond recognition, and a set of railroad tracks near Chapman were bent horizontally. An additional 11 tornadoes were confirmed on May 26; however, most were weak.

June was somewhat below average in terms of tornadic activity; 90 tornadoes were reported over the course of the month, of which 87 were confirmed. In the evening of June 11, an EF3 tornado impacted the city of Baker, Montana, demolishing several homes and a steel-framed barn. In the early afternoon of June 23, an isolated violent tornado impacted the outskirts of Yancheng in the Jiangsu province of China, where numerous homes were leveled, several vehicles were tossed, cell phone towers were destroyed and trees were completely debarked and denuded. The China Meteorological Association assigned the tornado a rating of EF4. July saw near-average tornadic activity throughout the United States, with 104 tornadoes being reported over the course of the month, though no significant outbreaks occurred. Tornadic activity in August was near-average in the United States, with 92 tornadoes having been reported as of August 27. In the evening of August 24, a rare outbreak of tornadoes impacted the states of Indiana and Ohio, along with the Canadian province of Ontario, with significant damage occurring in and around Kokomo, Indiana, Woodburn, Indiana, and Windsor, Ontario. The outbreak caused relatively few injuries and no fatalities.

Events

United States yearly total

January

There were 20 tornadoes reported in the United States in January, of which 18 were confirmed.

January 16–17

Several tornadoes were reported in the Tampa Bay area late in the evening of January 16 and into the early morning of January 17. The most significant tornado of the event, rated EF2, completely destroyed a mobile home and caused severe damage to a barn in the Duette area, resulting in two fatalities. Another high-end EF2 tornado damaged numerous structures in Siesta Key, including one home that had its second floor completely destroyed.

January 21–22

Six tornadoes touched down across the Deep South, five of which occurred in Mississippi. The strongest tornado of the event was a low-end EF2 near Sumrall, which caused considerable damage to a house and a garage.

February

There were 138 tornadoes reported in the United States in February, of which 99 were confirmed. This makes it the most active February since 2008.

February 2–3

Several tornadoes were reported across western Alabama and eastern Mississippi on February 2, including a large wedge tornado that struck Collinsville, Mississippi, tearing roofs off homes in the town and causing major structural damage at a church complex. Another EF2 tornado struck the west side of Scooba, causing damage to homes and the East Mississippi Community College campus. The most significant tornado of the day was a very high-end EF2 wedge tornado that destroyed numerous mobile homes and heavily damaged frame homes near McMullen, Alabama before it struck the nearby town of Carrollton, downing many trees. The following day, a high-end EF1 tornado caused considerable damage at Fort Stewart, Georgia. Overall, the event produced 14 tornadoes and no fatalities.

February 15–16

A small but damaging tornado outbreak impacted Florida and the Gulf Coast region of the United States. The event began on February 15, as multiple tornadoes affected an area extending from Louisiana to the Florida Pandhandle. This included a high-end EF2 tornado that caused major damage in and around Wesson, Mississippi. Later that evening, a large EF3 tornado (the first EF3 of 2016) struck the town of Century, Florida and destroyed numerous homes and mobile homes in the area. An EF1 tornado caused considerable damage in Sylvarena, Mississippi, while an EF2 completely destroyed a volunteer fire department building in Johnsonville, Alabama. Tornado activity continued the following day, as a few weak tornadoes occurred in the Miami metropolitan area and in North Carolina as well. The outbreak resulted in a total of 24 tornadoes and no fatalities.

February 23–24 

The second largest February tornado outbreak on record impacted the Gulf Coast and East Coast regions of the United States beginning on February 23. The first significant tornadoes of the outbreak moved across southeastern Louisiana and southern Mississippi that evening, leaving significant damage and three deaths. The towns of Livingston and Laplace, Louisiana sustained heavy damage from strong EF2 tornadoes, and another EF2 near Purvis, Mississippi killed one person in a mobile home. An EF3 tornado also caused major structural damage in Paincourtville, Louisiana before destroying an RV park in Convent, killing two people at that location. Three simultaneous waterspouts were observed over Lake Pontchartrain during the event as well. Later that night, a large supercell thunderstorm developed over the Gulf of Mexico and moved ashore, producing a destructive EF3 tornado in Pensacola, Florida. The tornado injured three people and destroyed homes, townhouses, apartments, and a GE warehouse.

The outbreak continued the following day as strong tornadoes impacted the East Coast states of Virginia, Pennsylvania, and North Carolina on February 24, killing four people. An EF1 tornado struck the town of Waverly, Virginia, killing three people in a mobile home, including a two-year-old child. An EF3 tornado struck the town of Evergreen, Virginia, causing severe damage and killing one person at that location. An EF2 tornado caused major damage to homes near Oxford, North Carolina, and another EF2 tornado touched down near White Horse, Pennsylvania, damaging up to 50 structures in the area. Another EF3 tornado occurred later that night near the Virginia town of Tappahannock, destroying multiple homes along its path. About 35,000 people in Virginia, 4,000 in Washington, D.C., and 47,000 in the Carolinas lost power due to the storms. Seven people were killed by tornadoes during the outbreak, and a total of 61 tornadoes were confirmed.

March

93 tornadoes were reported in the United States in March, of which 84 have been confirmed.

March 1

An EF2 tornado struck the McCalla, Alabama area, causing major damage to numerous homes and injuring four people. An EF0 tornado caused minor tree damage in the northern part of Opelika, Alabama, and another EF0 tornado near Sylacauga, Alabama caused minor damage to homes and destroyed outbuildings.

March 7–8

A historic flood event occurred in Texas, Arkansas, Louisiana and Mississippi, but the system also produced 12 tornadoes in Texas. The first EF1 tornado touched down during the evening of March 7, near Cool and damaged or destroyed several homes. Several more tornadoes touched down the next morning, including an EF1 tornado in Stephenville that damaged several businesses and an apartment complex. It was embedded in a large swath of straight-line winds that damaged other areas of Stephenville. Another brief EF1 tornado touched down in The Colony and caused damage to about six homes and also damaged some power poles. Several other brief EF0 tornadoes touched down in Dublin, Benbrook, and near Granbury, Tolar, Lampasas, and Andice. Shortly after noon, a brief EF1 tornado touched down in Navarro County, followed by an EF0 tornado in Henderson County, which caused damage in Trinidad and Malakoff. That evening, the final tornado of the event touched down near Fredonia and was rated an EF1. Flooding occurred the night of March 7 in areas west of Fort Worth, Texas, and severe flooding occurred in Louisiana starting during the night of the eighth and spreading to other locations in the following days. Evacuations were ordered in Haughton, where 30 homes were flooded, and at least 40 buildings and the Webster Parish Courthouse were flooded in Minden. In addition, evacuations also took place in Greenwood, Hammond, Rayville and Homer in Louisiana, Petal and Seminary in Mississippi, Dermott, Arkansas, and near Lake Mexia in Texas. Record river flooding also occurred on a stretch of the Sabine River due to record releases from the Toledo Bend Reservoir, and other record or near-record crests occurred on many other rivers across the South. Rain totals of up to 24 inches were recorded in northern Louisiana, with the highest total near Monroe, Louisiana.

March 15

During the morning of March 15, the Storm Prediction Center introduced an enhanced risk of severe thunderstorms for west central Illinois, southeastern Iowa, and northeastern Missouri, with a 10% chance of tornadoes for the same areas. The enhanced risk area was expanded westward in subsequent outlooks. That night, a small tornado outbreak occurred in eastern Iowa and western Illinois. A high-end EF2 tornado tracked near Rapids City, Illinois, injuring 10 people and destroying homes in a semi-rural subdivision near East Moline, while an EF0 touched down near McCausland, Iowa, causing minor tree damage. Another EF2 caused considerable damage near Trivoli, Illinois in Peoria County, and an EF0 caused damage in the city of Peoria and Peoria Heights. An EF1 occurred near Curran, Illinois, causing damage to homes west of Springfield, and another EF0 touched down north of Deer Grove, Illinois. A large tornado touched down in Good Hope, Illinois, initially causing EF0 roof damage in town before reaching EF2 strength further to the northeast, heavily damaging multiple farmsteads. Two other EF1 tornadoes touched down in Clinton County, Iowa, one of which struck a mobile home park near Low Moor, injuring three people. A total of nine tornadoes were confirmed from this event.

March 30–April 1

Early in the evening of March 30, a localized but significant tornado event impacted Oklahoma and Arkansas, including an EF2 that caused heavy damage to homes, businesses, and industrial buildings in the northern part of Tulsa, injuring four people. A second EF2 tornado from the same parent supercell severely damaged homes near Claremore, and destroyed barns at Will Rogers Downs. The following day, numerous weak tornadoes touched down in southern Middle Tennessee, Mississippi and Alabama, causing mostly minor damage. However, an EF2 tornado destroyed mobile homes and downed many trees near Hartselle and Priceville, Alabama. Tornado activity continued on the morning of April 1, as a few weak tornadoes occurred in parts of Alabama and Georgia. Overall, this outbreak produced 29 tornadoes and no fatalities.

April

142 tornadoes were reported in the United States in April, all of which were confirmed.

April 15 (Uruguay)
On April 15, a large and destructive F3 wedge tornado struck the city of Dolores, Uruguay, destroying at least 400 homes and buildings. Brick businesses in downtown Dolores sustained major structural damage, and streets were left covered in bricks and debris from collapsed walls and structures. Several cars were crushed by falling masonry, and others were thrown into buildings or tossed considerable distances and mangled. A large brick church was almost completely leveled, with only a few sections of its outer walls left standing, and several industrial buildings were destroyed as well. Residential areas in town were also devastated, with numerous well-built homes severely damaged or destroyed, and many trees and power lines downed. The National Emergency System reported five people dead and also more than 250 injured. Uruguay declared a state of emergency for the city of Dolores in the wake of the tornado. Storms, including floods, affected the rest of the country, with five more deaths in other areas.

April 26–27

On April 26 and 27, a large but weak tornado outbreak occurred across a large portion of the Great Plains. On the afternoon of April 26, the Storm Prediction Center issued a PDS tornado watch for most of the state of Oklahoma as well as portions of central Texas. A 10% hatched risk area for tornadoes extended from Nebraska to Texas, and multiple intense tornadoes were expected. However, the wind profile that evening did not support sustained supercell thunderstorms. As a result, only scattered weak tornadoes occurred, though EF1 tornadoes caused minor to moderate damage in parts of Oklahoma City and Tulsa. Weak tornado activity continued the following day in Nebraska, Iowa, Illinois, Missouri, and Kentucky, including an EF0 and an EF1 that caused minor damage in the western part of Omaha. An early morning EF0 blew a large tree over onto a mobile home near Tomball, Texas, killing an elderly woman inside. Overall, the outbreak produced at least 57 tornadoes and one death.

April 29–30

A storm system produced 15 tornadoes across parts of Oklahoma and Texas on the evening of April 29 and the following day. Two EF1 tornadoes destroyed mobile homes near Fletcher and Ninnekah, Oklahoma, and an EF2 caused major damage to some businesses in Lindale, Texas. The parent supercell that produced the Lindale tornado went on to produce a very large and long-track EF2 tornado that knocked over a cell phone tower, destroyed mobile homes, and severely damaged a frame home to the east of town. Another EF2 tornado damaged 27 homes near Alto, completely tearing the roofs off of two of them and destroying two travel trailers as well. A fourth EF2 tornado injured three people on April 30 when it completely destroyed a mobile home near Call, Texas.

May

239 tornadoes were reported in the United States in May, of which 218 were confirmed.

May 7–10

A significant tornado outbreak occurred across an area extending from Colorado to Kentucky, beginning with a large multiple-vortex EF2 tornado that tossed several RVs and injured two people near Wiggins, Colorado on May 7. Later that evening, a large stovepipe tornado caused high-end EF2 damage near Wray, while several other tornadoes tracked across other very rural areas of Colorado, causing no damage. Scattered tornadoes occurred on May 8, most of which were weak. However, a strong EF2 tornado caused considerable damage to outbuildings and high-voltage transmission line poles near Catharine, Kansas. On May 9, a significant tornado event unfolded across Oklahoma, as several strong to violent tornadoes touched down and caused severe damage in several parts of the state. A violent EF4 stovepipe tornado (the first EF4 of 2016 and the first violent tornado in the United States since an EF4 in Garland, Texas on December 26) near Katie, Oklahoma killed one person, leveled and swept away multiple homes, and left behind an extensive swath of ground scouring, while a large EF3 wedge tornado from the same parent supercell caused major damage near Sulphur. An EF3 tornado that tracked from near Connerville to Bromide destroyed a house and killed one person. Other strong tornadoes occurred as far north as Nebraska, including an EF2 tornado that tore the roof and some exterior walls from a home near Nehawka and injured one person. An EF1 tornado also caused minor damage in residential areas of Lincoln. Significant tornado activity continued on May 10, as several tornadoes moved across areas of western Kentucky, including an EF3 tornado that injured 10 people as it moved through the north edge of Mayfield, Kentucky, destroying numerous homes, vehicles, and businesses. Another tornado caused EF2 damage near Hartford. Overall, this outbreak killed two people and produced 57 tornadoes.

May 13–15 (Europe)

A significant three-day tornado outbreak produced many tornadoes across several countries in Europe in mid-May 2016, several of which were strong. The first tornado of the outbreak occurred in Russia, and was an F0 that caused minor roof damage in the Lebedevka area, while another F0 occurred near Kletskaya. In Austria, the town of Großdietmanns was struck by an F0 tornado, which caused minor tree damage and lofted lightweight outdoor objects. Numerous tornadoes touched down on May 14, mainly in western Russia, the strongest of which was an intense, long-tracked F3 that caused significant damage along a  path through Rostov Oblast, injuring five people in the process. The tornado struck the small villages of Razdol'nyy and Il'inka, damaging or destroying over 100 homes. A maintenance workshop was destroyed, and several electrical transmission towers were downed. Livestock was killed, cars were thrown, and numerous large trees were snapped or uprooted by the tornado as well. An F1 tornado also downed trees and damaged the roofs of 25 homes in and around Talove. Near Morozovsk, a large multiple-vortex F2 tornado twisted and broke power line pylons, while another F2 completely destroyed a grain warehouse, inflicted major roof damage to structures, and downed many trees and power lines near Nizhnyaya Verbovka. Numerous other F0 and F1 tornadoes caused minor to moderate damage across Russia later that afternoon and evening. In Turkey, a damaging F2 tornado struck Karadedeoğlu in Kastamonu Province, destroying three homes and damaging 40 others in the town. Trees, power lines, vehicles, and solar panels were also damaged by the tornado. On May 15, an F0 tornado briefly touched down in Dallgow-Döberitz, Germany, causing minor damage to roofs and garden sheds. A few other weak tornadoes occurred in Russia, Ukraine, and Romania as well. A total 24 tornadoes were confirmed as a result of this outbreak, none of which resulted in any fatalities.

May 15 (Brazil)

Two nighttime F2 tornadoes affected rural areas in the state of Santa Catarina in southern Brazil, destroying homes and cars. The tornadoes caused 4 deaths and 21 injuries.

May 22–26

During the week of May 22–27, a southwards dip in the jet stream occurred in the West near Colorado, with favorable thermodynamics advecting northwards and setting the potential for a tornado outbreak. In the early afternoon of May 22, an Enhanced risk was issued by the Storm Prediction Center for extreme southwestern Kansas, the Oklahoma Panhandle, and northern Texas. Numerous tornadoes touched down along the dryline that evening, with the strongest tornadoes touching down in Texas. This included a large, rain-wrapped EF3 tornado that destroyed homes and vehicles near Big Spring. Another EF3 destroyed oil pump jacks near Garden City, while two EF2 tornadoes in the same general area snapped numerous trees and power poles, damaged additional pump jacks, and destroyed a mobile home. Less widespread tornado activity occurred on May 23, with mainly scattered weak tornadoes occurring across central and southern Plains. However, a large nighttime wedge tornado caused EF3 damage to metal power poles near Turkey, Texas that night.

A significant outbreak of strong tornadoes affected Kansas on May 24. A single cyclic supercell produced nearly a dozen highly-visible tornadoes near Dodge City, with several reports of multiple tornadoes on the ground simultaneously. A total of five EF3 tornadoes and three EF2 tornadoes were confirmed in western Kansas that evening, affecting rural areas near Dodge City, Jetmore, Ness City, Lewis, and Kinsley. Scattered weak tornadoes were also observed across other parts of Kansas and other states as well. Less significant activity was expected on May 25, and only a few tornadoes occurred, though this included a half-mile wide EF4 wedge tornado that tracked from near Solomon to east of Chapman, Kansas. This violent tornado obliterated farm homes, debarked trees, bent railroad tracks, and mangled farm machinery and vehicles beyond recognition, though only eight minor injuries occurred along the path. Another significant outbreak of tornadoes occurred was expected to occur across Kansas on May 26, and a Moderate Risk with a 15% hatched risk area for tornadoes was issued by the Storm Prediction Center. Despite this, early initiation of storms combined with an unfavorable wind profile prevented a significant outbreak from occurring. However, a high-end EF1 tornado caused considerable damage in Bryan, Texas, while an EF2 and an EF1 occurred simultaneously near Navasota, resulting in heavy damage. Despite producing numerous strong to violent tornadoes, this outbreak sequence only affected rural areas, resulting in no fatalities and few injuries. 98 tornadoes were confirmed as a result of the outbreak sequence.

June

92 tornadoes were reported in the United States in June, of which 87 were confirmed.

June 5 (China)
On June 5, a strong stovepipe tornado occurred in Hainan Province in China. The tornado struck nine small villages near the town of Fengpozhen, located to the north of Wenchang. Masonry homes sustained major structural damage, including some that had their roofs torn off and exterior walls collapsed. Numerous large trees were snapped, uprooted, or denuded as well. A total of 178 homes were damaged or destroyed by the tornado, which was rated EF3. One person was killed, and 11 others were injured.

June 11
On the evening of June 11, an isolated EF3 tornado struck the town of Baker, Montana, destroying six homes and damaging at least 50 more. Many trees were snapped, denuded, and stripped of foliage. Several horses were killed, and six people were injured.

June 22–23

A moderate outbreak of mostly weak tornadoes impacted the Ohio Valley region beginning on the evening of June 22, and continuing into the early morning hours of June 23. Most of the tornadoes occurred in Illinois. An EF1 tornado struck the town of Troy Grove, Illinois, downing numerous trees and tree limbs throughout town. Another EF1 struck the northeastern part of Cissna Park, damaging trees, power poles, homes, outbuildings, and a baseball dugout. Near Seneca, an EF2 tornado crumpled four metal truss towers, damaged homes, and destroyed outbuildings. Another EF2 tornado clipped the southwestern edge of Pontiac, heavily damaging a few businesses, snapping power poles, destroying a mobile home, and injuring four people. Significant tornado activity pushed into Indiana early the next morning, with an EF1 and an EF2 tornado causing structural damage to homes and destroying outbuildings near Huntington. In Ohio, a long-tracked EF1 tornado touched down in Waynesville before lifting in Wilmington, damaging trees, homes, outbuildings, and a convenience store along its path. Overall this outbreak produced 23 tornadoes and no deaths.

June 23 (China)

A massive and violent EF4 wedge tornado produced catastrophic damage as it impacted the Funing area of Yancheng in Jiangsu Province, China on the afternoon of June 23. Thousands of masonry construction homes were destroyed, many of which were leveled. Trees were debarked, vehicles were tossed and destroyed, multi-ton metal shipping containers were lofted through the air, and metal power line pylons and truss towers were bent to the ground. Schools and manufacturing plants sustained major damage as well. 98 people were killed and 846 others were injured, many of them critically. A tornado of unknown intensity also caused damage and one death in the Sheyang area as well.

July

104 tornadoes were reported in the United States in July, however, 108 were confirmed.

July 7

Five tornadoes touched down across parts of Kansas and Missouri on the evening of July 7, two of which were strong and caused significant damage in Greenwood County, Kansas. The first was a large and slow-moving EF3 wedge tornado that swept away a poorly anchored house, obliterated corn crop, and snapped and denuded numerous trees near the Otis Creek Reservoir. The second damaging tornado was an EF2 that struck the town of Eureka, causing heavy damage to homes, trees, and a grain elevator in town. Mobile homes and outbuildings were completely destroyed, though no injuries or fatalities occurred.

July 11–14 (Europe)

From July 11 to July 14, a widespread outbreak of tornadoes affected various countries in Europe, including a few strong tornadoes. On July 11, an F1 tornado caused roof damage in the Magdagachi, Russia area, while another F1 downed many trees and damaged some buildings in Bogaczewo and Kretowiny, Ostróda County, Warmian-Masurian Voivodeship, Poland. Two separate tornadoes, rated F0 and F1, also downed trees and tree limbs near Reka Lelyug and Namsk, in the rural Komi Republic of Russia. The strongest tornado to touch down in Russia that day was an F2 that caused major roof damage to homes, and downed many trees and power lines in and around the village of Zaozër'ye in Smolensk Oblast. Another F2 tornado moved through Sharkaŭshchyna in Belarus, heavily damaging homes and apartment buildings, destroying outbuildings, and snapping trees and power poles. In Sweden, an F0 tornado touched down briefly in Gribbylund, snapping small trees near a pond. Tornadoes continued to touch down the following day, including an F1 that damaged a stable, some vehicles, and a farmhouse near Hijken, Netherlands. In Russia, an F0 tornado snapped tree limbs near Reka Porubok, while another brief F0 occurred near Karacharovo. Two F1 tornadoes also downed many trees near Vichkino and Muralevo. In Dzyarzhynsk, Belarus, a rain-wrapped F1 tornado caused considerable damage to roofs, trees, and fences, and speared a piece of roofing material through the windshield of a car. Another F1 tornado caused minor damage to homes in Stinatz, Austria and lofted a trampoline hundreds of yards into a forest.

A strong F2 tornado struck Kulyashouka, Belarus on July 13, where homes and apartment buildings had roofing torn off, many trees were snapped, and one apartment building sustained partial collapse of its top-floor exterior walls. Another tornado of unknown intensity snapped or uprooted hundreds of trees near Pryluki, Belarus as well. Later that evening, a destructive and long-tracked F3 tornado struck several villages in Moscow Oblast, travelling for 44 km, killing two people, injuring 29 others, and causing extensive damage along its path through the villages of Pershevo, Prudnya, and Kolyubakino. Numerous homes were severely damaged or destroyed along the path, including a few small homes that were ripped from their foundations. Greenhouses were destroyed, many trees were downed, and vehicles were damaged by the tornado as well. An F1 damaged roofs, trees, power lines, and cars in the Rostokino district of Moscow, and another F1 tornado injured six people in Amurskiy Poselok. A weak F0 and an F1 caused tree damage near Shishkino and Byli as well. A weak tornado also touched down briefly near Giengen an der Brenz, Germany. On July 14, an F0 tornado downed a tree near Nowe Grochale, Poland before the outbreak came to an end. Overall, 22 tornadoes occurred as a result of this outbreak, which produced two fatalities.

July 17

A small outbreak of tornadoes impacted Iowa, Illinois, Texas, and New Mexico. The most significant damage occurred in Iowa, where multiple towns sustained direct hits from tornadoes. Numerous trees were snapped and a co-op building was destroyed in the town of Andrew, Iowa as a result of an EF1 tornado. A destructive high-end EF2 tornado struck Vinton, causing major structural damage to homes and apartment buildings, snapping many trees and power poles, and severely damaging a ball field. Five people in Vinton were injured. Another EF2 tornado impacted the town of Walford, snapping trees, destroying one home and damaging the roofs of several others. No fatalities occurred as a result of the tornadoes.

July 25–26 (South Africa)

Several tornadoes were spotted on July 25 and July 26 across Gauteng province in South Africa.  The first was spotted in Randfontein on the West Rand of Johannesburg, where only minor damage was caused from trees being flattened, billboards pulled out of the ground and some roofs that were ripped off by strong winds. Another tornado swept through the East Rand in Tembisa and Kempton Park, northeast of O. R. Tambo International Airport.  This tornado damaged the Tembisa Hospital as well as the Phumulani Mall in Tembisa.  Approximately 20 people were injured and taken to nearby hospitals. No fatalities were reported.

August 

There were 111 tornadoes reported in the United States in August, of which 90 were confirmed.

August 14 (Philippines) 

A rare tornado hit Metro Manila, Philippines at around 4:30 p.m., local time, on August 14, 2016, amid floods and heavy rains caused by the southwest monsoon, which affected the island of Luzon. This was the second time in recorded history that a tornado struck the metropolis. The tornado was caused by a severe thunderstorm in Manila Bay. The tornado affected the city of Manila and Quezon City.

The tornado formed at the time of 4:25 pm in Baseco Tondo Compound. More than 200 houses were damaged and two people were injured. The water and electricity supply of the barangays in Quezon City, were shut down due to the tornado. More electric lines were damaged during the blast. The Tornado swept through the cities of Manila and Quezon City, in the Philippines. The tornado was seen traveling towards the districts of Intramuros and Sampaloc, and then to Galas and New Manila in Quezon City. It toppled trees, electrical posts and destroyed property along its way. Among those hit and damaged was the National Press Club building in Intramuros. Parts of the glass staircase of the NPC was destroyed and as well as some of makeshift eateries in front. Several houses were reported damaged and a number of residents were injured in the Baseco compound in Tondo and at least 1,000 residents were evacuated from the tornado. The twister shattered the glass door of a 24-hour convenience store and toppled some trees on G. Tuazon Street.

August 20 

On August 20, 2016, a storm system produced multiple weak tornadoes across portions of Michigan, Indiana, Ohio and Kentucky. Two EF0 tornadoes, part of a very weak tornado family of 6, caused damage and extensive power outages in the Grand Rapids metropolitan area. Most damage occurred to trees and utility poles, but some damage to homes and structures happened mostly due to trees falling on them or weak construction. No fatalities or injuries resulted from this event.

August 24 (United States and Canada) 

An unusual late-season outbreak of 24 tornadoes impacted Indiana, Ohio, and Ontario on the afternoon and evening of August 24, some of which were strong and damaging. This outbreak was largely unexpected, as the Storm Prediction Center only issued a slight risk that day, with the tornado threat limited to a 2% threat area across parts of Kansas, Iowa, Missouri, and Illinois. Despite this, numerous tornadoes touched down further to the east across parts of the Ohio Valley and Great Lakes, becoming the largest August tornado outbreak in both Indiana and Ohio. The first tornado of the event was an EF2 that caused damage to 30 homes and several outbuildings near Linnsburg, Indiana. Later that day, an EF3 tornado struck the southern part of Kokomo, Indiana, damaging or destroying 1,000 homes, several apartment buildings, and a Starbucks, as well as downing many trees and power lines. A high-end EF3 tornado near Woodburn, Indiana swept away a poorly anchored house, obliterated well-built barns, scoured farm fields, debarked trees, and mangled several vehicles and pieces of farm machinery. A car was carried at least 585 yards into a field by this tornado, and a combine was thrown 200 yards. As the tornado activity pushed into Ohio later that evening, significant tornadoes continued to touch down as a large, multiple-vortex EF2 tornado caused major damage to farmsteads near Cecil, Ohio, while another strong EF2 tornado caused severe damage to homes, barns, and a business near Defiance. Further to the north, a high-end EF2 tornado ripped through parts of Windsor, Ontario, severely damaging several factories and industrial buildings along the E.C. Row Expressway, one of which was completely leveled. Multiple vehicles were severely damaged, including several large cube vans that were dragged through a parking lot. Garbage dumpsters were thrown up to 120 yards away, power poles were snapped, and large amounts of sheet metal was wrapped around guard rails and power lines. Trees were downed and homes sustained structural damage in residential areas as well. Another tornado developed over the Detroit River before moving ashore and striking Lasalle, Ontario at EF1 strength, causing roof, window, and siding damage to homes as well as downing many trees and damaging several boats. The outbreak produced numerous other weak tornadoes across the region before coming to an end. No fatalities occurred as a result of the outbreak.

August 27–28 

Scattered tornadoes occurred across the states of North Dakota, Minnesota, Iowa, and Michigan during a two-day period. Most of these tornadoes remained over open country, though a few caused damage. On August 27, a large EF1 tornado tossed small trailers, destroyed a small barn, and snapped and uprooted many trees near Emerado, North Dakota. An EF3 tornado near Hillsboro ripped the roof and exterior walls from a well-built house, severely damaged a grain elevator, and destroyed half of a metal building. The following night, a multiple-vortex EF2 tornado snapped numerous trees and power poles, completely destroyed a barn, and caused considerable roof and wall damage to two homes near Gary, Minnesota. Eight tornadoes were confirmed in total.

September 

36 tornadoes were reported in the United States in September; however, 40 were confirmed.

September 9

A strong EF2 tornado caused major damage at a farmstead near Sidney, Illinois, where a farm house was twisted off of its foundation and largely collapsed. Barns and garages were also destroyed, and headstones were damaged in a cemetery. A car and an RV camper sustained damage, and another home sustained roof damage. An EF1 tornado also overturned an RV camper, tore shingles from the roof of a house, and caused tree damage near Bismarck, Illinois. A few other weak EF0 tornadoes touched down in other parts of Illinois, as well as in Minnesota and Texas.

September 28 (Australia)
A severe thunderstorm event, which struck parts of the Australian state of South Australia, including the capital Adelaide, generated seven confirmed tornadoes with three rated as strong as F2, in what was the largest tornado outbreak ever recorded in the state. An F2 filmed near Wilmington was powerful enough to bend large electricity towers in half, contributing to a total statewide power outage, as well as destroying several farm sheds and outbuildings. Three other damaging tornadoes were officially analysed by the Bureau of Meteorology in the Mid North region, with houses un-roofed, grain silos destroyed and large areas of trees uprooted. The storm outbreak also resulted in tennis-ball sized hail, damaging straight line winds and intense rainfall.

October 

23 tornadoes were reported in the United States in October, of which 21 were confirmed.

October 6 

On October 6, the Storm Prediction Center issued an enhanced risk for severe thunderstorms in the Kansas area, including the risk of tornadoes. Several tornadoes touched down, including two unseasonably strong tornadoes to the east of Salina. The first of these two tornadoes was an EF2 that snapped trees and completely destroyed a barn. The second was a large EF3 stovepipe tornado that obliterated a double-wide manufactured home, tossed farm equipment, snapped and denuded trees, and rolled a Jeep 200 yards. Further to the east, tornadoes also touched down in Illinois and Iowa. This included an EF1 tornado that tracked from Davenport to  Cordova, damaging trees, vehicles, and homes along its path. A homeless shelter in downtown Davenport sustained damage from this tornado. A total of 11 tornadoes were confirmed.

October 12 (Indonesia) 
A tornadic waterspout moved ashore and caused damage in Pangadaran, killing one person and damaging several houses.

October 14 

On October 14, an extratropical cyclone moved through the Pacific Northwest, causing a rare strong tornado in Oregon. The tornado began as a large waterspout before moving ashore. The tornado was assigned an EF2 rating in the town of Manzanita, where the tornado left behind torn off roofs, damaged homes, and destroyed businesses. Many trees and power lines were downed as well. A total of 129 homes and two businesses were impacted. No severe injuries were reported. A second weaker tornadic waterspout also struck Oceanside, but caused no noticeable damage and was rated EFU.

November

There were 69 tornadoes reported in the United States in November, of which 50 were confirmed.

November 6 (Italy)

Along the west coast of central Italy, a supercell thunderstorm produced a strong tornadic waterspout which developed over the ocean and moved inland as it struck the town of Ladispoli, to the northwest of Rome. Structures had their roofs ripped off, vehicles were damaged, road signs were destroyed, and large trees were uprooted in town. Boats were damaged near the waterfront, and a crane collapsed. Multiple six to nine-story high rise apartment buildings sustained severe damage to balconies, windows, and walls, including one that sustained total collapse of a large portion of one of its exterior walls. One person was killed by falling masonry in this area. The tornado continued to the northeast and damaged a railway station before reaching rural areas near Ceri. Numerous trees were snapped and uprooted, while several cottages, restaurants, villas and farms sustained damage. Some of these structures sustained major damage to roofs and walls, and vineyards in the area suffered heavy damage. The tornado continued into the Ponton dell'Elce area, causing significant roof damage to homes and to a church. The tornado then reached its peak intensity as it struck Cesano, where structures sustained total roof and wall loss, vehicles were flipped, trees and signs were downed, and structures that remained standing were bombarded by projectiles. Another fatality occurred in this area as a man was killed in his vehicle by a falling tree. Numerous large trees were snapped and uprooted at Veio Regional Park before the tornado passed near Morlupo. Light poles, signs, and trees were downed in this area, roofs were blown off, and a van was rolled before the tornado dissipated. Two people were killed and many others were injured by this tornado, which was rated F3. An F1 tornado that caused damage to farm buildings was confirmed near Saccheddu as well.

November 26 (Indonesia) 
A damaging tornado touched down in Sidrap, Sulawesi killing one person and injuring two others. Twenty houses were damaged or destroyed, including 6 houses that were largely destroyed or flattened to the ground, 7 houses with significant damage, and 7 other houses that had minor damage.

November 27–30

On November 27, a storm system produced two EF0s and an EF1 in South Central Nebraska, causing minor damage. On November 28, the SPC issued an Enhanced risk of severe weather for Louisiana and Mississippi. Only one tornado touched down in the threat area, a brief EF0 that remained over a rice field near Marksville, Louisiana. However, the surface low associated with system produced a few EF0 tornadoes in Iowa. Minor damage occurred in the towns of Radcliffe and Parkersburg, the latter of which was devastated by an EF5 tornado in May 2008.

The next day, the SPC issued a Moderate risk for central Mississippi and portions of Louisiana, Alabama, and Tennessee. This included a large 10% hatched risk area for tornadoes, and a smaller 15% hatched risk area for tornadoes across northern Mississippi. Throughout the late afternoon and evening, multiple supercell thunderstorms developed. Hail and winds battered Mississippi, and several EF1 tornadoes caused minor to moderate damage in rural areas of the state. After sunset, the event rapidly escalated into a significant outbreak as the intensifying supercell thunderstorms pushed into Alabama, and significant tornadoes began touching down. An EF2 tornado near Belgreen snapped many trees and injured one person when a house was damaged and shifted on its foundation. Two EF2 tornadoes moved through Winston County and heavily damaged or destroyed multiple homes, mobile homes, and outbuildings, and also snapped numerous trees and power poles near Arley and Double Springs. An EF2 tornado touched down over Monte Sano Mountain in eastern Huntsville, snapping and uprooting many trees, and damaging numerous homes as it passed through several subdivisions, a few of which had roofs torn off. A horse riding arena was also destroyed by the Huntsville area tornado. An EF3 tornado passed near the towns of Danville and Neel, causing major structural damage to industrial buildings, homes and a fire station. A motorcycle shop was leveled, vehicles were tossed, and several mobile homes were completely destroyed as well. At around midnight and into the very early morning hours of November 30, the storms moved into northeastern Alabama and southern Tennessee. A powerful EF3 tornado ripped directly through the town of Rosalie and to the north of Ider, killing four people and injuring nine others. The Rosalie/Ider tornado destroyed homes and mobile homes, churches, and businesses along its path. A shopping plaza in Rosalie was leveled by the tornado, and a daycare center near Ider was reduced to a bare slab. Further to the north, strong tornadoes were impacting communities in Tennessee, including an EF3 that severely damaged the town of Ocoee. The Ocoee post office and fire station were destroyed, two people were killed in town, a cell phone tower and a metal truss tower were knocked down, and 20 people were injured. A high-end EF2 tornado struck Athens, destroying several businesses and manufactured homes, heavily damaging a large church complex, and injuring 20 people. A few homes sustained major structural damage and a double-wide mobile home was completely destroyed by another high-end EF2 tornado that passed near Whitwell and Dunlap. After sunrise, additional weaker tornadoes touched down in Louisiana, Alabama, Georgia, Florida, and South Carolina. This included several brief tornadoes that caused minor to moderate damage in and around Atlanta. A high-end EF1 downed many trees and damaged numerous homes in Simpsonville, South Carolina as well. Overall, the outbreak produced 48 tornadoes, killed six people, and injured many more.

December

14 tornadoes were reported in the United States in December, however, 19 were confirmed.

December 25

A small tornado event affected Kansas and Nebraska on Christmas Day. In Kansas, EF0 tornadoes occurred near the towns of Kismet, Ensign, Bucklin, Greensburg, and Alton. These tornadoes caused minor damage to homes, trees, grain bins, and outbuildings. In Nebraska, an EF1 tornado near the town of Funk snapped power poles, and damaged irrigation pivots and trees. No injuries or fatalities occurred as a result of these tornadoes.

See also
 Weather of 2016
 Tornado
 Tornadoes by year
 Tornado records
 Tornado climatology
 Tornado myths
 List of tornado outbreaks
 List of F5 and EF5 tornadoes
 List of F4 and EF4 tornadoes
 List of North American tornadoes and tornado outbreaks
 List of 21st-century Canadian tornadoes and tornado outbreaks
 List of European tornadoes and tornado outbreaks
 List of tornadoes and tornado outbreaks in Asia
 List of Southern Hemisphere tornadoes and tornado outbreaks
 List of tornadoes striking downtown areas
 List of tornadoes with confirmed satellite tornadoes
 Tornado intensity
 Fujita scale
 Enhanced Fujita scale
 International Fujita scale
 TORRO scale

References

 
Tornado-related lists by year
2016 meteorology
Torn